WLOV (1370 AM) is a radio station licensed to Washington, Georgia, United States.  It is currently owned by Southern Stone Broadcasting and operated under a Local Marketing Agreement (LMA) by Oconee Communications Company.

History
The station went on the air as WGPL on Oct. 1, 1984. On April 15, 1986, it changed its callsign to WLOV.

On August 14, 1998, Cumulus Media purchased WLOV-AM and WLOV-FM from P&T Broadcasting for $533,000.

References

External links

LOV
Radio stations established in 1984
1984 establishments in Georgia (U.S. state)
LOV